Sir Henry George Hill Mulholland, 1st Baronet, PC(NI), DL (20 December 1888 – 5 March 1971) was a Northern Ireland politician.

Mulholland was the third son of The 2nd Baron Dunleath and Norah Louisa Fanny Ward. He was educated at Eton and Trinity College, Cambridge. He was a good cricketer at Cambridge University where he won a Blue for cricket in three seasons from 1911 to 1913, and he also played a first-class match for Ireland against Scotland in 1911.

He was a member of the House of Commons of Northern Ireland for Down and was Assistant Parliamentary Secretary at the Ministry of Finance and Assistant Whip from 1925 until 1929, after which he served as Speaker of the House. He was admitted to the Privy Council of Northern Ireland in 1930 and in 1945 he was created a Baronet, of Ballyscullion Park in the County of Londonderry.

Mulholland married Sheelah Brooke (1895-1982), daughter of Sir Arthur Brooke, 4th Baronet, and sister of The 1st Viscount Brookeborough, Prime Minister of Northern Ireland. He died in March 1971, aged 82, and was succeeded in the baronetcy by his son Michael, who in 1993 succeeded his cousin as fifth Baron Dunleath.

References

External links
CricketArchive: Henry Mulholland
 

1888 births
1971 deaths
People educated at Eton College
Alumni of Trinity College, Cambridge
Baronets in the Baronetage of the United Kingdom
Deputy Lieutenants of Down
Lord-Lieutenants of County Londonderry
Ulster Unionist Party members of the House of Commons of Northern Ireland
Members of the House of Commons of Northern Ireland 1921–1925
Members of the House of Commons of Northern Ireland 1925–1929
Members of the House of Commons of Northern Ireland 1929–1933
Members of the House of Commons of Northern Ireland 1933–1938
Members of the House of Commons of Northern Ireland 1938–1945
Northern Ireland junior government ministers (Parliament of Northern Ireland)
Members of the Privy Council of Northern Ireland
Younger sons of barons
Irish cricketers
Cambridge University cricketers
Speakers of the House of Commons of Northern Ireland
Cricketers from Northern Ireland
Members of the House of Commons of Northern Ireland for County Down constituencies